Maxyutovo (Mäqsüt) is a rural locality (a village) in Ilchimbetovsky Selsoviet, Tuymazinsky District, Bashkortostan, Russia. The population was 45 as of 2010. There is 1 street.

Geography 
Maxyutovo is located 15 km southwest of Tuymazy (the district's administrative centre) by road. Bakhchisaray is the nearest rural locality.

References 

Rural localities in Tuymazinsky District